LBK refers to Linearbandkeramik or Linear Pottery culture, a European Neolithic archaeological horizon.

LBK may also refer to:

 Landing Barge, Kitchen, a class of US Navy vessel
 Ljusdals BK, a bandy club in Sweden
 LBK, National Rail station code for Long Buckby railway station, England 
 LBK, informal abbreviation for Lubbock, Texas
 Left Below Knee, a category of amputation
 Long Buckby railway station, station code
 Lake Bernadette Killas, a category of buds for life